The Business Post (formerly The Sunday Business Post) is a Sunday newspaper distributed nationally in Ireland and an online publication. It is focused mainly on business and financial issues in Ireland.

Founding to Irish financial crisis
The Sunday Business Post was co-founded by four people: the economist and editor Damien Kiberd, Aileen O'Toole (former editor of Business & Finance), Frank Fitzgibbon (editor of The Sunday Times Ireland) and James Morrissey (spokesperson for Denis O'Brien).

The SBP was previously owned by Thomas Crosbie Holdings (TCH). It was then owned by Key Capital, Paul Cooke and staff members (6% equity for staff). It was then owned by Sunrise Media, the shareholders of which include Key Capital. It is now owned by Kilcullen Capital Partners.

The paper's first edition appeared on 26 November 1989. While TCH's other major newspaper titles, the Irish Examiner and Evening Echo, are based in Cork, the Post is published in Dublin. The paper describes itself as "Ireland's Political, Economic and Financial Newspaper". It is a general newspaper with a strong emphasis on commerce, politics and financial markets. The newspaper does not have a sports section or letters section. Three supplements are published weekly with the newspaper: Post Plus, The Magazine, an entertainment and features magazine; and a property supplement. A once-monthly Computers in Business magazine is also included.

Ted Harding succeeded Kiberd as editor of the paper in 2001 and edited the paper for three years, resigning in October 2004.

Examinership (2013)
An interim examiner was formally appointed to Post Publications Ltd, publisher of The Sunday Business Post newspaper, on 15 March 2013. The High Court was told that there might be a voluntary redundancy scheme at the newspaper in late 2013 which would target 25 staff positions. This could coincide with pay cuts of 7% for employees and further possible changes as part of a financial restructuring plan for the company, the court was told.

It was reported on 28 April 2013 that two companies were interested in acquiring the SBP from the examiner. Landmark Media Investments, which acquired some of the assets of Thomas Crosbie Holdings, was no longer interested in the title. It was also reported that the SBP required an investment of at least €2m to acquire the paper and restructure it. Any new bidder would have to fund the cost of laying off some staff.

On 8 May 2013, it was reported that The Sunday Business Post had started staff redundancies. Up to ten staff were to leave the company by 10 May 2013. Staff were also told about a third pay cut. Post Publications was also looking to reduce the amount paid to its landlord by €1 million per year.

It was reported on 12 May 2013 that bidders for The Sunday Business Post included Michael Brophy, a former chief executive of Independent News & Media (Northern Ireland).

On 15 May 2013, Post Publications was back in court. It reported that the examiner had failed to find a buyer in the first 70 days of the examinership. The examiner was given a final 30-day extension to find a buyer. If a buyer did not materialise, the examiner had to advise the court immediately. Annual revenue fell from €15.3 million to €7.3 million in the five years to 2013. Circulation revenue fell from €4.9 million to €3.6 million in the last 5 years to 2013. The newspaper had 76 full-time employees and 123 freelance contributors and made a loss of €1.2 million in the year to 2013.

Paul Cooke and Key Capital Ownership (2013–2018)
On 8 June 2013, it emerged that Key Capital, Paul Cooke and staff (6% equity for staff) had acquired The Sunday Business Post.

Examinership ended on 19 June 2013. The new owners of the SBP, Brindisi Ltd, took out a €350,000 loan to part-fund the purchase. Several staff left the paper, including former chief executive Fiachra O'Riordan, former senior assistant editor Kieron Wood and former deputy chief sub-editor Garvan Grant.

In the trading year for 2014, Post Publications Limited made a pre-tax loss of €628,000. Post Publications Limited paid €409,374 for redundancy payments and a new premises. Shareholders had pumped an additional €300,000 into the company; staff numbers had reduced again. Post Publications employed an average of 61 people in the year to the end of June 2014. Both circulation and advertising revenue remain "under pressure", the directors noted.

In July 2014, Post Publications Ltd., the publisher of the paper, announced that Cliff Taylor would leave the paper after ten years as editor. Pat Leahy, the paper's deputy editor and political editor, was the paper's acting editor until Ian Kehoe was made editor.

On 13 July 2016, it was announced that Paul Cooke had sold his stake to Key Capital. Cooke also resigned as managing director. The SBP became legally owned by Sunrise Media, and the main shareholder in Sunrise Media is Conor Killeen's Key Capital.

Kilcullen Capital Ownership (2018 – present day)
In September 2017, it was reported that The Sunday Business Post was for sale. In September 2018, it was announced that Kilcullen Kapital Partners (KKP) had acquired the SBP under the ownership of Enda O'Coineen. KKP owned the SBP via a company called Encircle Business Post 365.

In October 2018, it was announced that a three-to-four-month consultation was occurring at The Sunday Business Post that might lead to the print closure. At a later stage, it was announced that the paper version of the paper would not close.

In March 2019, it was announced that Encircle Business Post 365, the company that owns the SBP, had acquired event management company iQuest from outgoing owner Michael Nolan.

In April 2019, it was announced that the CEO of the Post Publications was leaving the company and it was reported that the SBP owner might float it on a stock exchange.

In July 2019, it was reported that Beach Point Capital have provided backing to the owners of the Sunday Business Post. Beach Point Capital have a charge over certain assets. Beach Point Capital have also provided backing to Maximum Media and Irish Studio.

In July 2019, Richie Oakley was made the editor of the Sunday Business Post.

In September 2019, it was revealed that the previous owner, Sunrise Media, wrote off €1.1m it had invested in the newspaper following its sale to Kilcullen Kapital.

In September 2019, it was reported that big changes were to occur at the Sunday Business Post. It is to go daily, go global and change the name to the Business Post.

In October 2019, it was reported that the owner of the Sunday Business Post had closed a deal to buy a portfolio of magazine titles including Irish Tatler, Food & Wine and Auto Ireland, from US-Irish investors in an all-share transaction.

In November 2019, the Sunday Business Post was rebranded as the Business Post.

In April 2020, the Business Post cut staff salaries and availed of government support. Advertising had declined due to the Covid-19 situation.

In January 2023, Daniel McConnell was made editor of the Business Post.

Circulation history

No ABC circulation statistics are available post June 2019 because the Business Post no longer publishes a certificate.

References

External links
 

1989 establishments in Ireland
Mass media in Dublin (city)
Newspapers published in the Republic of Ireland
Newspapers established in 1989
Sunday newspapers published in Ireland
Thomas Crosbie Holdings